Pemena is a tribal religion of Karo people of Indonesia. Pemena means the first or the beginning. Pemena is regarded as the first religion of Karo people. One of the doctrines of Pemena is the concept of Dibata.

See also
 Parmalim

References

Batak
Asian ethnic religion
Religion in Indonesia